Holmes Township is a civil township of Menominee County in the U.S. state of Michigan. The population was 296 at the 2000 census.

Geography

Demographics
As of the census of 2000, there were 296 people, 130 households, and 89 families residing in the township.  The population density was 4.2 per square mile (1.6/km2).  There were 414 housing units at an average density of 5.8 per square mile (2.2/km2).  The racial makeup of the township was 99.32% White, 0.34% African American and 0.34% Native American.

There were 130 households, out of which 24.6% had children under the age of 18 living with them, 60.0% were married couples living together, 4.6% had a female householder with no husband present, and 30.8% were non-families. 27.7% of all households were made up of individuals, and 14.6% had someone living alone who was 65 years of age or older.  The average household size was 2.25 and the average family size was 2.69.

In the township the population was spread out, with 19.9% under the age of 18, 3.4% from 18 to 24, 26.0% from 25 to 44, 29.4% from 45 to 64, and 21.3% who were 65 years of age or older.  The median age was 45 years. For every 100 females, there were 114.5 males.  For every 100 females age 18 and over, there were 115.5 males.

The median income for a household in the township was $35,547, and the median income for a family was $37,857. Males had a median income of $31,071 versus $26,429 for females. The per capita income for the township was $15,196.  About 9.6% of families and 14.8% of the population were below the poverty line, including 14.5% of those under the age of eighteen and 7.0% of those 65 or over.

References

Townships in Menominee County, Michigan
Marinette micropolitan area
Townships in Michigan